The De Mita Cabinet was the 46th cabinet of the Italian Republic. It held office from 1988 to 1989.

After being appointed as new president of the Christian Democracy, De Mita was forced to resign due to several hassles between his party and the PSI. After that, President Francesco Cossiga gave the presidential mandate to form a new cabinet to Giovanni Spadolini and then again to De Mita, until the formation of a new government led by Giulio Andreotti, on 23 July 1989.

Party breakdown
 Christian Democracy (DC): Prime minister, 15 ministers, 35 undersecretaries
 Italian Socialist Party (PSI): Deputy Prime minister, 9 ministers, 19 undersecretaries
 Italian Republican Party (PRI): 3 ministers, 5 undersecretaries
 Italian Democratic Socialist Party (PSDI): 2 ministers, 3 undersecretaries
 Italian Liberal Party (PLI): 1 minister, 4 undersecretaries

Composition

|}

References

1988 establishments in Italy
1989 disestablishments in Italy
Italian governments
Cabinets established in 1988
Cabinets disestablished in 1989